Moïse Wilfrid Maoussé Adiléhou (born 1 November 1995) is a professional footballer who plays as a centre-back for Azerbaijan Premier League club Zira. Born in France, he represents Benin internationally.

Club career
Adiléhou made his professional debut for Slovan Bratislava against Spartak Myjava on 27 February 2016.

On 1 September 2020, Adiléhou joined Eerste Divisie club NAC Breda. His contract was not extended after the 2021–22 season, effectively making him a free agent.

Adiléhou signed a one-year contract with an option for an additional year with Azerbaijan Premier League club Zira on 4 August 2022.

International career
Adiléhou was born in France and is of Beninese descent. He debuted for the Benin national football team in a friendly 1–0 loss with Mauritania on 25 March 2017.

Career statistics

International

Scores and results list Benin's goal tally first, score column indicates score after each Adiléhou goal.

References

External links
 ŠK Slovan Bratislava official club profile 
 
 Futbalnet Profile 
 

1995 births
Living people
Sportspeople from Colombes
Footballers from Hauts-de-Seine
Association football defenders
Citizens of Benin through descent
Beninese footballers
Benin international footballers
French footballers
French sportspeople of Beninese descent
Valenciennes FC players
Pau FC players
AS Vitré players
ŠK Slovan Bratislava players
PAE Kerkyra players
Levadiakos F.C. players
Boluspor footballers
NAC Breda players
Zira FK players
Slovak Super Liga players
2. Liga (Slovakia) players
Super League Greece players
TFF First League players
Eerste Divisie players
2019 Africa Cup of Nations players
Beninese expatriate sportspeople in Slovakia
Beninese expatriate sportspeople in Greece
Beninese expatriate sportspeople in Turkey
Beninese expatriate sportspeople in the Netherlands
Expatriate footballers in Slovakia
Expatriate footballers in Greece
Expatriate footballers in Turkey
Expatriate footballers in the Netherlands
Expatriate footballers in Azerbaijan